Shah Abdul Karim Bulri (1538–1623) was a famous poet of the Sindhi language from Sindh, Pakistan. Shah Abdul Karim Bulri was the great-great-grandfather of the famous poet Shah Abdul Latif Bhittai.

Early life 
He was born in a Syed family in Matiari, presently in eastern Sindh. Since he spent most of his life in Bulri, a village in the Tando Muhammad Khan, the word Bulri is often appended to his name. As his father died when he was young, he was brought up by his mother and elder brother Syed Jalal. From childhood, he took a keen interest in matters related to God and spirituality and often didn't pay attention to the lessons taught in school and instead spent his time immersed in thoughts of God. He frequently went to mystical gatherings in where sermons accompanied by rural music were sung. This affected him so much that little by little he started to compose his own poetry.

When he was of age, Shah Abdul Karim married as per the wish of his elder brother Syed Jalal Shah. He met a very devout individual in his local mosque named Sultan Ibrahim and, impressed by him, became his disciple. After the death of his elder brother, to take care of his family, he became a laborer as per the advice of Sultan Ibrahim.
Shah Abdul Karim imposed a very stringent discipline on himself which few people around him knew of. He used to work in the day with interludes for prayer. In the night, he used to walk around the locality filling any earthen pots he found empty. As he grew older he wrote many spiritual poems in Sindhi and used them as a device to express his love for the Divine. During his old age, he was highly respected by the people and had a number of disciples.

His poetry and malfuzat appeared for the first time in Bayan al-Arifin wa Tanbih al-Ghafilin, a Persian work, written by a disciple he had later in his life named Mir Daryai Tharawi, in 1630, seven years after his death. One of the major poets of Sindhi, Shah Karim Bulri has been called the Chaucer of Sindhi Literature.

Poetry and beliefs 
Shah Abdul Latif gave a pantheistic meaning to many Quranic expressions such as,
 He is the first, He is the last, The Apparent and the Hidden (57:3)
 Wheresoever you may turn there is the face of God (2:115)
 He is nearer to you than your jugular vein (50:16)
 Every moment he discloses himself in fresh glory (55:29)

Shah sang, Separation and union are one and the same, God, the best of proposers, will unite the lover and the loved one. Shah Abdul Latif knew of the works of Ibn Arabi and his doctrine of Wahdat-ul-Wujood and based his life on those principles. He wrote 93 lines of Sindhi poetry.

See also 
Jalal al-Din Rumi
Shah Abdul Latif Bhittai
Sachal Sarmast

References 

Sufi poets
Sindhi people
Sindhi-language poets
Sufis of Sindh
Mughal Empire Sufis
1623 deaths
1538 births
Hashemite people
Pakistani people of Arab descent